Line 6 Finch West, also known as the Finch West LRT, is a light rail line under construction in Toronto, Ontario, Canada, to be operated by the Toronto Transit Commission. The , 18-stop line is to extend from Finch West station on Line 1 Yonge–University to the North Campus of Humber College in Etobicoke. Unlike most of the Toronto streetcar system, the line will be segregated from traffic. As well, it will use transit signal priority and standard gauge rather than the broad Toronto gauge. The line is forecast to carry about 14.6million rides a year or 40,000 a day by 2031 and will replace the 36 Finch West bus route (west from Finch West station), which is one of the three busiest bus routes in Toronto. The line is scheduled for completion in 2023, with an estimated cost of $2.5billion.

History 

Finch Avenue West is currently served by the 36 Finch West bus, one of the three busiest Toronto Transit Commission bus routes in Toronto with about 42,600 passengers per weekday. Forecasted demand in 2031 would require 32–39 articulated buses or 45–55 standard buses to serve the route.

In March 2007, Toronto mayor David Miller announced the  Etobicoke–Finch West LRT as part of the Transit City project to build several light-rail lines within the city. The western terminus of the line would be built in the Highway 27 / Humber College area in Etobicoke. The line would run along Finch Avenue West eastward, terminating at Finch station in North York.

On April 1, 2009, the Government of Ontario announced that it would provide funding for construction of this line from Humber College to Don Mills station via Finch West and Finch stations, opening in 2013. In March 2010, the Ontario government budgeted less for building transit. As a result, it eliminated the proposed section of the line east of Finch West station.

In December 2010, Mayor Rob Ford cancelled the line after taking office. However, in February 2012, city council voted to restore the project, along with the Eglinton Crosstown LRT (later renamed Line 5 Eglinton), as part of a new transit plan, restoring some of the elements of the Transit City proposal over Mayor Ford's objections.

In April 2012, Metrolinx proposed to start construction on the Finch West LRT in 2015, with the line opening in 2018. By November 2012, when the city and province signed an LRT master agreement, construction for the line was to begin in 2015 for completion in 2020. In April 2015, the province announced that construction of the line would start in 2016 for completion in 2021.

Procurement 
In September 2015, the Government of Ontario announced that its agency, Infrastructure Ontario, would search for a contractor to design, build, finance and maintain the Finch West LRT. The successful contractor would be chosen by 2017. The Request for Proposal (RFP) was released to select companies in February 2016 and closed on December 20, 2017.

In May 2017, Metrolinx confirmed that it had entered into an agreement with Alstom to build 17 light rail vehicles for Line 6 Finch West. In September 2017, Metrolinx announced the line would not open until 2022 at the earliest, blaming the delay on uncertainty with the Bombardier vehicle supply.

In April 2018, Mosaic Transit Group, a consortium of ACS Infrastructure Canada Inc., Aecon, and CRH Canada Group Inc., was selected to build the transit line. After consultation with Mosaic on a construction schedule, Metrolinx delayed projected completion of the line to 2023, ten years after the originally announced date. That May, Infrastructure Ontario and Metrolinx announced that Mosaic had signed a contract to design, build, and finance the construction of the line and stations, and to maintain them for 30 years after their initial opening.

Effective June 20, 2021, the TTC renumbered the Bay bus route from 6 to 19 to free up the route number 6 for the Finch West line.

Construction 

Initial preparatory utility works began in 2016. Enbridge Gas Distribution relocated natural gas pipelines lower within the roadway to allow for an appropriate depth beneath the proposed track-bed. Other utility work followed, with replacement and relocation of watermains, hydro poles and hydro cables. In the second quarter of 2019, substantial construction of the project began with work on the maintenance and storage facility (MSF).

In June 2020, the Highway 400 overpasses over Finch Avenue were removed and replaced over two consecutive weekends, using a "rapid bridge replacement" technique. This involved moving the old overpass aside in one piece and installing a new overpass in its place. By late October 2020, the first rails were being installed at the line's new maintenance and storage facility, with the first vehicles scheduled to arrive in mid-2021.

In December 2020, Mosaic Transit Partners awarded Bombardier Transportation a 30-year contract to maintain Line 6's light-rail vehicles as well as wayside systems such as track and overhead catenary. Bombardier was also chosen to maintain the fleet and wayside systems for Line 5 Eglinton in a different contract.

In January 2021, the first of 11 traction power substations that will power the trains was installed. This first substation would power an initial  section of track between Norfinch Road / Oakdale Drive and Sentinel Road to allow for train testing.

In late January 2022, the first vehicle test on the Finch West LRT occurred at its maintenance and storage facility. In February 2022, an LRV made a  trip from the MSF along York Gate Boulevard onto Finch Avenue. Main line testing is expected to take place in late 2022.

Besides the double-track mainline, the total track to be laid included the maintenance and storage facility (MSF), crossovers and pocket tracks. By September 1, 2022, 47 percent of mainline track had been laid.

By late November 2022, the first eight platform canopies had been installed at the Driftwood stop; 116 canopies were to be installed, including two at Humber College station. Earlier in the fourth quarter, the first two electrical cabinets were installed at the Driftwood stop. 29 cabinets were to be installed along the line to power lights, fare machines and security systems.

Route

Route description 

From west to east, the  line will run from Humber College's North Campus at Highway 27 in Etobicoke to Finch West station on Line 1 Yonge–University, at Keele Street in North York. Between the two terminals, there will be 16 on-street stops, all along Finch Avenue, where tracks run in the middle of the street, segregated from traffic.

From its western terminal, Humber College station, the line will run north in a trench along the west side of Highway 27 to its intersection with Finch Avenue, where the line will curve east in a short tunnel under the intersection and rise to street level along Finch Avenue.

On Finch Avenue east of Highway 27, there will be two centre-reserved lanes for the LRT flanked by two traffic lanes in each direction as well as bike lanes. The Westmore stop will be the first stop (from west to east) of 16 along the route.

At the Rowntree Mills stop, the line will cross the Humber River where Islington Avenue and Finch Avenue intersect on a bridge over the river with far-side stops on opposite sides of the river.

The line passes the Pearldale, Duncanwoods, Milvan Rumike, Emery, and Signet Arrow stops before passing under Highway 400. One block east of the Norfinch Oakdale stop, at York Gate Boulevard, there will be a wye junction to the line's maintenance and storage facility. The next stop, Jane and Finch, will be a transfer point to the 35 Jane bus, which was the TTC's fifth busiest bus route in 2018.

After passing the Driftwood and Tobermory stops, Line 6 runs over Black Creek and the Sentinel stop will be the last on-street stop before the line's eastern terminal.

The line will serve several neighbourhoods along its route. Between Highway 27 and the Humber River, the line will serve the Rexdale neighbourhood of Etobicoke, which includes the Mount Olive–Silverstone–Jamestown neighbourhood (also known as Smithfield). There will be five on-street stops in the neighbourhood excluding the Rowntree Mills stop which straddles the Etobicoke / North York boundary at the Humber River. Between the Humber River and Highway 400 in North York, the line will serve the Humber Summit neighbourhood on the north side of Finch Avenue and Humbermede on the south side. There are five on-street stops in this area again, excluding Rowntree Mills. Between [[[Ontario Highway 400|Highway 400]] and Keele Street (Finch West station), the line will serve the Jane and Finch neighbourhood, which includes its namesake stop along with four other on-street stops.

Stops 

In January 2018, to avoid naming conflicts with existing TTC and GO stations in Toronto, a consultation process was initiated to select unique names for the stops at Jane, Kipling, Islington, and Weston; the initial suggestions were Jane and Finch, Mount Olive, Thistletown, and Emery Village, respectively. Based on public feedback, Rowntree Mills was also considered, and ultimately selected, for the stop at Islington, while Emery was chosen as the name for the stop at Weston.

Stop description 
The line will be built with 18 stops, of which 16 are on-street. Finch West station will be built as a double-length underground station.

All stops and the two terminal stations will use transparent glass for walls, partitions and skylights. The terminal stops will use transparent glass for elevators and their shafts. This is to conform to crime prevention through environmental design (CPTED) standards to create a bright and safe environment for riders. Using glass takes advantage of natural light to provide a more attractive environment for riders.

The on-street stops will have canopies, lights, fare machines, cameras and a PA system. There will be electrical cabinets at each stop to power electrical equipment and to provide backup power in case of an outage.

Operations

The line will be operated by the Toronto Transit Commission and maintained by Mosaic Transit Group as part of the public–private partnership contract with Metrolinx. A fleet of 17 Alstom Citadis Spirit vehicles will be used on the line. Thanks to dedicated tracks separated from traffic and transit signal priority at intersections, when open, the line will provide service 20 percent faster than buses in mixed traffic, as well as increased reliability due to its segregation from traffic. The line will also remove 35 morning and 29 afternoon peak period buses from existing traffic lanes.

According to Metrolinx, Line 6 will have a frequency of every five to seven minutes during peak hours and seven to ten minutes at off-peak times. The estimated travel time between terminals will be 38 minutes. Bicycles will be allowed on board, stored in the bicycle racks inside the vehicles, during the off-peak hours. The line will support Presto fare media.

The maximum operating speed for vehicles on the mainline will be . The line has nine traction power substations stored in pre-built structures along the line.

The line will carry about 42,600 passengers per weekday. By 2031, projected ridership is around 2,800 passengers per hour in the peak direction. Annual operating and maintenance costs are estimated to be $51.5million in 2022, before deducting fare revenue and costs saved by eliminating parallel bus service.

Intermediate turnback points
The line will have six intermediate turnback points in addition to the turnbacks at the two terminal stations. All but one turnback point have a pair of crossovers, one facing-point and the other trailing-point. The crossovers at or near the Westmore and Sentinel stops are just one stop away from the western and eastern terminals respectively. The turnback points from west to east are:
 Roughly halfway between Westmore and Martin Grove stops (pair of crossovers)
 East of Albion stop (trailing-point crossover)
 East of Mount Olive stop (pair of crossovers)
 East of Milvan Rumike stop (pair of crossovers)
 East of Norfinch Oakdale stop (pair of crossovers)
 East of Sentinel stop (pair of crossovers)

Maintenance and storage facility

Metrolinx has constructed a maintenance and storage facility (MSF) on a lot on the north side of Finch Avenue West between York Gate Boulevard and Norfinch Drive next to Monsignor Fraser College's Norfinch Campus. The MSF will have facilities to service the Alstom Citadis Spirit light rail vehicles used on the line, as well as the line trackage.

The facility will have  of track, including both exterior storage and interior tracks. There is also  of track to connect the MSF to Finch Avenue via York Gate Boulevard. Once the line is completed, LRVs leaving the facility will be able to enter service either in an eastbound or westbound direction.

Construction of the facility started in 2019, and the MSF was ready to receive its first LRV by the end of July 2021. With completion of the MSF, Mosaic Transit Group will start to test LRVs and the communication system. In late 2021, a section of the line from the MSF to Sentinnel Road will be energized for up to 18 months of testing.

In 2020, Metrolinx was criticized for proposing to sell off land in the Jane and Finch neighbourhood located in front of the MSF, contrary to initial promises to local community groups. A  strip of land along Finch Avenue is currently being used as a construction staging area by Mosaic Transit Group. In March 2021, Metrolinx cancelled their proposal and agreed to provide the land at zero cost to allow for the construction of a community hub by the City of Toronto and the local community, following completion of the line.

Rolling stock 
The fleet for the line will consist of 17 Alstom Citadis Spirit light rail vehicles. Each LRV will have four wheelchair positions. There will be no designated areas for strollers, but these could be parked at locations with fold-up seats. Each vehicle weighs .

The trains were ordered in May 2017 by Metrolinx, as part of a joint order of 121 trains for Hurontario LRT and Finch West, at cost of $528million. The trains are being built at an Alstom plant in Brampton. The first vehicle was assembled in September 2020 and arrived from Alstom at the MSF in two sections on July 28 and 29, 2021. The second LRV arrived in two sections on November 12, 2021. A third vehicle arrived in 2022.

The same type of vehicles will be used for the Hurontario LRT in neighbouring Mississauga. The line was originally supposed to use the same Bombardier Flexity Freedom trains planned for Line 5 Eglinton; however, this order was cancelled by Metrolinx following delivery delays by Bombardier.

Potential extensions
Several extensions to the line have been proposed; however, as of 2021, none of the proposed extensions have been funded for design or construction.

Finch West station to Finch station

The line was originally planned to extend from Finch West station to Finch station on the Yonge leg of Line 1 as part of the original Transit City proposal as well as The Big Move. This segment was included in the 2010 environmental assessment of the line. In March 2010, the Ontario government eliminated the proposed section of the line between Finch West and Finch because of budget constraints.  In 2013, this plan was revived as an "unfunded future rapid transit project" in the City of Toronto's "Feeling Congested?" report, indicating that this extension may be constructed sometime in the future. The extension was later shown in the TTC's 2018 Corporate Plan with no timeline for completion. At its February 20, 2020, meeting, the Metrolinx board of directors endorsed a prioritization framework for a proposed frequent rapid transit network that included a proposed LRT extension from Finch West station to Finch station; with a forecast ridership of 6,600 in 2031 and a proposed line length of  along Finch Avenue West, the project scored "high" with a preliminary benefit–cost ratio of 0.36 to 0.65.

Humber College to Pearson Airport
In 2009, the TTC was studying the feasibility of potential routings for a future westward extension of the Etobicoke–Finch West LRT to the vicinity of Woodbine Live development, Woodbine Centre, and Pearson International Airport. The airport is primarily in Mississauga but within the Toronto fare zone. This extension was later reclassified as a future transit project as described in the 2013 "Feeling Congested?" report by the City of Toronto. Metrolinx has also noted the potential of an extension to the airport, albeit noting that this is an unfunded proposal. In May 2021, Toronto City Council discussed a potential  extension south from Humber College to a new GO Transit station on the Kitchener line. At its February 20, 2020, meeting, the Metrolinx board of directors endorsed a prioritization framework for a proposed frequent rapid transit network that included a proposed LRT extension from Humber College to Pearson International Airport; with a forecast ridership of 2,500 in 2031 and a proposed line length of  along Highway 27, Disco Road, Carlingview Drive, Dixon Road, Airport Road, Bresler Drive, Campus Road and Viscount Road, the project scored "medium" with a preliminary benefit–cost ratio of lest than 0.26.

Finch station to Don Mills station
In May 2009, Metrolinx proposed that the line be extended from Finch station along Finch Avenue East and Don Mills Road into Don Mills station to connect with the Sheppard East LRT and Line 4 Sheppard and create a seamless crosstown LRT line in northern Toronto to parallel the Eglinton Crosstown LRT (later renamed Line 5 Eglinton) in central Toronto. The TTC said that a planning study would have commenced in 2010.

See also
 Urban rail transit in Canada
 Jane LRT, an inactive project that, if built, would intersect Line 6 Finch West

Notes

References

External links
 Official TTC site
 Metrolinx Finch West LRT project page
 Mosaic Transit Group
  published by Metrolinx on May 12, 2020, showing a simulation of boarding an LRT train

Light rail in Canada
Transit City
6
The Big Move projects
Public–private partnership projects in Canada
Standard gauge railways in Canada
Rapid transit lines in Canada
Buildings and structures under construction in Canada
2023 in rail transport